Abu'l-Hasan Ali Rayhani (died ) was an Iranian author, bureaucrat and poet, who served as a high ranking civil secretary (katib) under the Abbasid caliph al-Mamun.

References

Sources 
 

9th-century Iranian people
Officials of the Abbasid Caliphate
Poets from the Abbasid Caliphate
9th-century people from the Abbasid Caliphate
830s deaths
Year of birth unknown
Year of death uncertain